The Paleo-Balkan languages or Palaeo-Balkan languages is a grouping of various extinct Indo-European languages that were spoken in the Balkans and surrounding areas in ancient times.

Paleo-Balkan studies are obscured by the scarce attestation of these languages outside of Ancient Greek and, to a lesser extent, Messapic and Phrygian. Although linguists consider each of them to be a member of the Indo-European family of languages, the internal relationships are still debated.

Due to the processes of Hellenization, Romanization and Slavicization in the region, the only modern descendants of Paleo-Balkan languages are Modern Greek—which is descended from Ancient Greek—and Albanian—which evolved from either Illyrian, Thracian, Dacian or another related tongue.

Classification 

Proto-Indo-European
Paleo-Balkan linguistic area
Unclassified
Illyrian languages (onomastic areas)
Illyrian proper (or Southeast Dalmatian)
Central Dalmatian (or Dalmatian-Pannonic)
(?) Liburnian
Messapic
(?) Daco-Thracian
Thracian
(?) Daco-Moesian
Dacian, Moesian and Getic
(?) Mysian
Paeonian
Proto-Albanian (argued to be either part of the Illyrian or Daco-Thracian branch, or descending from another unclassified Paleo-Balkan language)
 (?) Graeco-Phrygian
Hellenic
(?) Ancient Macedonian
Proto-Greek
Ancient Greek (esp. northern dialects)
(?) Phrygian / Armeno-Phrygian (common ancestor of Phrygian and Proto-Armenian)

Subgrouping hypotheses 

Illyrian is a group of reputedly Indo-European languages whose relationship to other Indo-European languages as well as to the languages of the Paleo-Balkan group, many of which might be offshoots of Illyrian, is poorly understood due to the paucity of data and is still being examined. The Illyrian languages are often considered to be centum dialects but this is not confirmed as there are hints of satemization. Today, the main source of authoritative information about the Illyrian language consists of a handful of Illyrian words cited in classical sources, and numerous examples of Illyrian anthroponyms, ethnonyms, toponyms and hydronyms.

A grouping of Illyrian with Messapian has been proposed for about a century, but remains an unproven hypothesis. The theory is based on classical sources, archaeology, as well as onomastic considerations. Messapian material culture bears a number of similarities to Illyrian material culture. Some Messapian anthroponyms have close Illyrian equivalents.

A grouping of Illyrian with Venetic and Liburnian, once spoken in northeastern Italy and Liburnia respectively, is also proposed. The consensus now is that Illyrian was quite distinct from Venetic and Liburnian, but a close linguistic relation has not been ruled out and is still being investigated.

Another hypothesis would group Illyrian with Dacian and Thracian into a Thraco-Illyrian branch, and a competing hypothesis would exclude Illyrian from a Daco-Thracian grouping in favor of Mysian. The classification of Thracian itself is a matter of contention and uncertainty.

The place of Paeonian remains unclear. Not much has been determined in the study of Paeonian, and some linguists do not recognize a Paeonian area separate from Illyrian or Thracian. Phrygian, on the other hand, is considered to have been most likely a close relative of Greek.

The classification of Ancient Macedonian and its relationship to Greek are also under investigation. Sources suggest that Macedonian is in fact a variation of Doric Greek, but also the possibility of their being related only through the local sprachbund.

Albanian

The Albanian language is considered by current linguistic consensus to have developed from one of the non-Greek, ancient Indo-European languages of the region. For more historical and geographical reasons than specifically linguistic ones, the widespread claim is that Albanian is the modern descendant of Illyrian, spoken in much the same region in classical times. Alternative hypotheses hold that Albanian may have descended from Thracian or Daco-Moesian, other ancient languages spoken farther east than Illyrian. Not enough is known of these languages to completely prove or disprove the various hypotheses.

See also
 Balkan sprachbund
 Graeco-Armenian
 Origin of the Albanians
 Paleo-Balkan mythology
 Prehistory of Southeastern Europe
 Armeno-Phrygians

References

Sources

Further reading
 Grbić, Dragana. "Greek, Latin and Palaeo-Balkan Languages in Contact". In: Rhesis International Journal of Linguistics, Philology and Literature Linguistics and Philology 7.1. Atti del Workshop Internazionale “Contact Phenomena Between Greek and Latin and Peripheral Languages in the Mediterranean Area (1200 B.C. - 600 A.D.)” Associazione Culturale Rodopis - Università degli Studi di Cagliari, Dipartimento di Filologia Letteratura e Linguistica, 13-14 aprile 2015, 2016, 7.1, pp. 56-65.

 
Indo-European languages
Extinct languages of Europe